Kumud Dhital (Nepali: कुमुद धिताल) is a Nepalese cardiothoracic specialist and Heart & Lung Transplant Surgeon at Yashoda Hospitals, Hyderabad, India. His prior work experience was at St Vincent's Hospital, Sydney and, Australia. In fall 2014, Dr. Dhital was head of the surgical team who completed the world's first “dead heart” transplant. A “dead heart” is a heart donated after circulatory death (DCD), where the heart has stopped beating. , 3 patients had received DCD heart transplants. It helps to buy certain time(3 to 6 hrs) for the dead heart to transplant in a receiver.

Dhital was also an associate professor and senior lecturer in surgery at the University of New South Wales. As a faculty member at the Victor Chang Cardiac Research Institute, Dhital worked closely with Professor Peter MacDonald, the medical director of the St Vincent's Heart Transplant Unit. St Vincent's Hospital and the Victor Chang Cardiac Research Institute collaborated to develop their successful DCD transplant technique.

References

Living people
Nepalese surgeons
Academic staff of the University of New South Wales
Year of birth missing (living people)